The North Dakota League was a Minor League Baseball league which operated in five North Dakota cities in . The Class D level league had four teams at the start of its season, with one team relocating in July. The league evolved from the South Dakota League, with the Minot Magicians winning the 1923 championship.

1923 North Dakota League teams
Bismarck, North Dakota:  Bismarck Capitals 
Jamestown, North Dakota:  Jamestown Jimkotas 
Minot, North Dakota:  Minot Magicians 
New Rockford, North Dakota & Carrington, North Dakota:  New Rockford-Carrington Twins 
Valley City, North Dakota:  Valley City Hi-Liners

Standings & statistics

1923 North Dakota League
schedule
  New Rockford-Carrington moved to Valley City July 17. 

Note: New Rockford/Carrington relocated to Valley City on July 17, 1923.

References

External links
Baseball-Reference (Minors)

Defunct minor baseball leagues in the United States
Baseball leagues in North Dakota
Defunct baseball teams in North Dakota
Sports leagues established in 1923
Sports leagues disestablished in 1923